Muttathu Varkey (28 April 1913 – 28 May 1989) was an Indian novelist, short story writer, and poet of Malayalam. He was best known for a genre of sentiment-filled romantic fiction known as painkili (janapriya) novel in Malayalam literature.

Life
Varkey was born in Chethipuzha, a small village near Changanassery in Kottayam district, Kerala. He began his career as a school teacher at Saint Berchmans High School, Changanassery. He then took up the job of an accountant in a timber factory. For a brief period, Varkey taught in a Tutorial College run by M. P. Paul. He then joined Deepika newspaper as an associated editor and remained there for next 26 years until his retirement in 1974.

Literary career
Muttathu Varkey emerged as one of the popular writers of Malayalam fiction. He along with Kanam EJ was prominent in popularizing a genre of sentiment-filled pulp fiction known as painkili novel in Malayalam literature. He was a prolific writer and has penned a total of 132 books, including 65 novels. The rest of his works include collections of short stories, plays, and poetry. Many of his novels were adapted into Malayalam films, including the Prem Nazir starrer Padatha Painkili (1957), Inapravukal (1965), Velutha Kathreena (1968), Mayiladum Kunnu (1972) and the Sathyan starrer Karakanakadal (1971).

Selected works

Paadaatha Painkili
Oru Kudayum Kunjupengalum
Inapravukal
Karakanakkadal
Mayiladum Kunnu
Velutha Kathreena
Akkarappacha
Azhakulla Selina
Pattuthoovaala
Mriyakutty

Filmography 

 Padatha Painkili (1957)
 Inapravukal (1965)
 Velutha Kathreena (1968)
 Mayiladum Kunnu (1972)
 Azhakulla Saleena (1973)
 Karakanakadal (1971)
 Kottayam Kunjachan (1990)

Muttathu Varkey Award

Muttathu Varkey Foundation has instituted the Muttathu Varkey Award to be presented yearly to Malayalm writers. The winner is selected by popular vote with final decisions made by prominent judges. The prominent winners of the award include, O. V. Vijayan (1992), Vaikom Muhammad Basheer (1993), M. T. Vasudevan Nair (1994), Kovilan (1995), Kakkanadan (1996), VKN (1997), M. Mukundan (1998), Punathil Kunhabdulla (1999), Anand (2000), N. P. Mohammed (2001), Ponkunnam Varkey (2002), Sethu (2003), C. Radhakrishnan (2004), Zacharia (2005), Kamala Surayya (2006), T. Padmanabhan (2007), M. Sukumaran (2008), N.S. Madhavan (2009), P. Valsala (2010), Sarah Joseph (2011), N Prabhakaran (2012) C. V. Balakrishnan (2013), Asokan Charuvil (2014), K. Satchidanandan (2015), K. G. George (2016), T. V. Chandran (2017) and K. R. Meera (2018)

See also 

 List of Malayalam-language authors by category
 List of Malayalam-language authors

References

External links
muttathuvarkey.com

 
 

Malayalam-language writers
Dramatists and playwrights from Kerala
Indian male short story writers
Indian male novelists
Malayalam-language dramatists and playwrights
Malayalam poets
Malayalam novelists
Malayalam short story writers
1913 births
1989 deaths
20th-century Indian novelists
20th-century Indian dramatists and playwrights
Indian male poets
Indian male dramatists and playwrights
20th-century Indian short story writers
People from Kottayam district
20th-century Indian poets
Poets from Kerala
20th-century Indian male writers
Novelists from Kerala